Pak Chong City Football Club (Thai ปากช่องซิตี้), or Pakchong School Alumni Association F.C. is a Thai semi-professional Football Club based in Pak Chong District in Nakhon Ratchasima, Thailand. The club is currently playing in the 2018 Thailand Amateur League Eastern Region.

Record

References

 http://www.supersubthailand.com/news/8176-11/index.html#sthash.3yXFBELY.dpbs
 http://www.supersubthailand.com/news/7844-9/index.html#sthash.gd0CSEWC.dpbs
 https://www.youtube.com/watch?v=uIkdgB1-k3M
 https://www.youtube.com/watch?v=WWigPjjKs-Q

External links
 Facebook Page

Association football clubs established in 2014
Football clubs in Thailand
Nakhon Ratchasima province
2014 establishments in Thailand